Alan W. Armstrong (born December 15, 1939) is an American writer. His best known book is the children's novel Whittington, published in 2005, which was a Newbery Medal honor book. 

Armstrong is married and lives in Massachusetts.

Works
; reprint, Random House Digital, Inc., 2011, 
; reprint Random House Digital, Inc., 2009, 
Whittington (Random House, 2005)

See also

References

External links

1939 births
American children's writers
Newbery Honor winners
21st-century American novelists
American male novelists
Living people
21st-century American male writers